Chori Mera Kaam (English: Stealing is my Job) is a 1975 Bollywood comedy film, produced by Chander Sadanah, directed by Brij Sadanah and written by K. A. Narayan. The film stars Ashok Kumar, Shashi Kapoor, Zeenat Aman, Pran, Deven Verma, Iftekhar and Raza Murad. The film's music is by Kalyanji-Anandji. Deven Verma won his first Filmfare Award for Best Comedian for the film.

Cast

Ashok Kumar as Shankar
Shashi Kapoor as Bholanath "Bhola"
Zeenat Aman as Sharmili
Pran as Inspector Kumar / Shera
Deven Verma as Parvin Chandra Shah 
Raza Murad as Inspector Shyam 
Iftekhar as Police Commissioner
David as John
Anwar Hussain as Amarchand Rathod
Urmila Bhatt as Parvati Rathod
M. B. Shetty as Shetty
Marutirao Parab as D'souza
Chaman Puri as Shambhu, Sharmila's Father
Jankidas as Auctioneer
Anoop Kumar as Police Constable

Soundtrack
All lyrics were penned by Verma Malik.

Awards
 23rd Filmfare Best Comedian Award for Deven Verma

References

External links 
 

1975 films
1970s Hindi-language films
Films scored by Kalyanji Anandji
Indian crime comedy films
1970s crime comedy films
1970s heist films
Indian heist films
1975 comedy films
Films directed by Brij Sadanah